Centro de Treinamento Arremessando para o Futuro, or simply Espírito Santo Basquetebol, is a Brazilian basketball team from Vila Velha, Espírito Santo, Brazil.

History 
Espírito Santo was founded in 2000 as CETAF/Vila Velha, but it disputed its first Brazilian championship in 2008, and at the same moment the team from Vila Velha also disputed Nossa Liga de Basquete. In 2009, they disputed the first edition of Novo Basquete Brasil, finished the regular in the tenth position and did not disputed the playoffs of that season. In the second season, 2009–10 NBB season, the team finished the regular in a worse position, twelfth place. But, due new rules of Liga Nacional de Basquete, it won the right to compete its first and only playoffs where it was defeated by Joinville, after a series by 3–0. In the two following seasons, Vila Velha made terrible campaigns. To the 2012–13 NBB season Vila Velha began a process of renovation of players and technical committee.

Roster

References

External links
Official website 

Basketball teams in Brazil
Sports teams in Espírito Santo
Novo Basquete Brasil